Write-only memory may refer to:
 Write-only memory (joke), a jocular term for a useless device
 Write-only memory (engineering), memory that cannot be read by the processor writing to it

See also
 Write-only (disambiguation)